This is a list of freeways in Victoria, Australia. Victoria is a state of Australia, in the south-east of the country. The Victorian road network services the population centres, with highways generally radiating from Melbourne and other major cities and rural centres with secondary roads interconnecting the highways to each other. Many of the highways are built to freeway standard. Victoria has the most extensive freeway and road network in Australia.

M1

Princes Freeway 

The Princes Freeway is the second longest freeway after the Hume Freeway. It is 159 kilometres long. It Continues on from the Princes Highway at Tralagon and ends at the Princes Highway at Geelong. It replaces the Princes Highway between Melbourne and Geelong. It has 4-6 lanes between Tralagon and Narre Warren, from there it is the Monash Freeway to Toorak Road where it continues as CityLink to the Burnley Tunnel before turning into the Westgate Freeway, at the Western Ring Road it turns back into the normal Princes Freeway, where it has 8 lanes. Its major junctions are Western Ring Road, Princes Highway, Berwick-Cranbourne Road and Strzelecki Highway. It is the second busiest freeway in Victoria after the Monash Freeway. The major towns it passes through are Tralagon, Morwell, Moe, Warragul, Pakenham, Berwick and Geelong.

Monash Freeway 

The Monash Freeway is 34 kilometres long. It continues on from the Princes Freeway at Narre Warren and turns into CityLink at Toorak. The Monash Freeway replaces the Princes Freeway between Melbourne and Narre Warren. During the afternoon the Monash Freeway is the busiest Freeway in Victoria. It has 10 lanes for all the Monash Freeway's length. The Monash Freeways major junctions are South Gippsland Freeway, EastLink, Springvale Road, Burke Road and Warrigal Road. The major towns it passes through are Berwick, Narre Warren, Hallam, Dandenong, Mulgrave, Chadstone and Toorak.

CityLink 

The underground Southern Link directly connects the ends of the West Gate and Monash Freeways into one continuous through-way. This link comprises the twin Burnley and Domain Tunnels which pass under the Royal Botanic Gardens and the Yarra River, each tunnel channelling traffic in different directions.

West Gate Freeway 

The West Gate Freeway is a 14 kilometre Freeway which starts at the Burnley Tunnel at Melbourne and turns into the Princes Freeway near Laverton North. The Westgate Freeway replaces the Princes Freeway between Laverton and Melbourne. The Westgate Bridge is on the Westgate Freeway. The Westgate Freeway has 8 lanes for its entire length. Its major junctions are the CityLink, Western Ring Road, Geelong Road, Docklands Highway, Montague Street and St Kilda Road. The major towns are Melbourne and Laverton North.

Geelong Ring Road 

The Geelong Ring Road is a freeway that bypasses Geelong. It starts at the Princes Freeway at Corio and ends at the Princes Highway at Waurn Ponds. Geelong Ring Road is 25 kilometres long. The Geelong Ring Road has 4 lanes for its entire length. Its major intersections are Midland Highway, Hamilton Highway, Bacchus Marsh Road and Cox Road. The Geelong Ring Road was built in sections, the first section being complete in 2008.

M2

CityLink 

The elevated Western Link extends the existing Tullamarine Freeway, lengthening it to terminate it five kilometres further south at the West Gate Freeway in Port Melbourne. It includes the Bolte Bridge, named after former Premier Sir Henry Bolte over the Yarra River in the Docklands; a long elevated section over Dudley Flats and Moonee Ponds Creek and a tube-like sound barrier in Flemington where the road passes close to a number of community housing towers. City link then continues on connecting to the Tullamarine Freeway at Strathmore.

Tullamarine Freeway 

The Tullamarine Freeway is a 13 kilometre Freeway which continues on from CityLink at Strathmore and turns into Sunbury Road at Tullamarine. The Tullamarine Freeway links Melbourne to the Airport. The Tullamarine Freeway is a very busy road during all hours of the day. The Tullamarine Freeway has 8 lanes for its entire length. Its major junctions are Calder Freeway, Western Ring Road and Sunbury Road. The major towns it passes through are Strathmore and Tullamarine.

M3

Eastern Freeway 

The Eastern Freeway is an 18 kilometre Freeway which continues on from EastLink at Nunawading and ends at Alexandra Parade at Melbourne. The Eastern Freeway has 6 lanes for all of its length. It can get busy during the afternoon. Like Eastlink The Eastern Freeway is a part of M3 route. Its major intersections are Springvale Road, Chandler Highway, Burke Road. and Hoddle Street. The Major towns are Box Hill, Doncaster and Melbourne.

EastLink 

Eastlink is a Tollway which continues from the Eastern Freeway at Nunawading and goes for 39 kilometres to Frankston Freeway at Carrum Downs. It has 4 lanes between Frankston Freeway and Thompson Road, from there it continues as 6 lanes. Eastlink links Frankston to Ringwood. Eastlink's major junctions are the Monash Freeway, Princes Highway, Maroondah Highway, Burwood Highway, Springvale Road and Thompsons Road. The major towns Eastlink passes through are Carrum Downs, Bangholme, Dandenong South, Springvale, Rowville and Ringwood.

Frankston Freeway 

The Frankston Freeway is a 7 kilometre freeway which is a continuation of Eastlink and begins at the Mornington Peninsula Freeway interchange at Carrum Downs and turns into the Moorooduc Highway near Cranbourne-Frankston Road at Frankston. It originally connected to the Mornigton Peninsula Freeway prior to the construction of Eastlink. The Frankston Freeway has 4 lanes between Moorooduc Highway and Seaford Road, from there it continues as 6 lanes onwards. Its major junctions are EastLink, Peninsula Link, Dandenong Valley Highway and Seaford Road. The major towns it passes through are Frankston, Seaford and Carrum Downs.

M4

West Gate Tunnel

M8

Western Freeway 

The Western Freeway is the third-longest freeway in Victoria after the Hume Freeway and the Princes Freeway. It is 125 kilometers long. It starts at the Western Ring Road at Derrimut and turns into the Western Highway near Ballarat. It replaces the Western Highway between Ballarat and Melbourne. It has 4 lanes between Melbourne and Ballarat but turns into two lanes after passing the Sunraysia Highway. Its major junctions are the Midland Highway, Sunraysia Highway, Melton Highway and Ballarat Road. The major towns it passes through are Derrimut, Melton, Bacchus Marsh and Ballarat.

M11

Mornington Peninsula Freeway 

The Mornington Peninsula Freeway is 36 kilometres long. It starts at Dingley Bypass at Dingley Village and ends at Boneo Road at Mount Martha. When it gets to Frankston Freeway it continues on as Peninsula Link before becoming the Mornington Peninsula Freeway again at the Moorooduc Highway junction. The Mornington Peninsula Freeway stays a 4 lane road for all its length. The major junctions are Frankston Freeway, Peninsula Link, Nepean Highway, Thompsons Road and Jetty Road. The major towns are Chelsea, Carrum Downs, Seaford, Moorooduc, Safety Beach, Dromana and Mount Martha. Peninsula Link is a 25 kilometre Freeway. It starts at Mornington Peninsula Freeway and EastLink and ends at Moorooduc Highway & Mornington Peninsula Freeway. The major junctions are Frankston Dandenong Road, Cranbourne-Frankston Road and Frankston-Flinders Road. The major towns are Carrum Downs, Frankston East, Baxter and Moorooduc.

M31

Hume Freeway 

The Hume Freeway is the longest freeway in Victoria. It is 303 kilometres long. It starts at the Metropolitan Ring Road at Thomastown, Melbourne and ends at the Hume Highway in Albury-Wodonga at the border. It replaces the Hume Highway in most of Victoria. It has 4 lanes all the way through to Albury-Wodonga. It has a lot of major junctions such as the Goulburn Valley Freeway, Goulburn Valley Highway, Murray Valley Highway and Northern Highway. The Hume Freeway has a lot of traffic during the afternoon. The major towns it passes through are Seymour, Benalla, Wangaratta, Wodonga and Albury.

M39

Goulburn Valley Freeway 

The Goulburn Valley Freeway is 42 kilometres long. It starts at the Hume Freeway at Seymour and turns into the Goulburn Valley Highway near Nagambie. It replaces the Goulburn Valley Highway between Seymour and Nagambie. It has 6 lanes all the way to Nagambie. Its major junctions are Goulburn Valley Highway and Avenel-Nagambie Road. The major towns it passes through is Seymour. In all of Victoria the Goulburn Valley Freeway is the least busy freeway in Victoria.

M79

Calder Freeway 

The Calder Freeway is 113 kilometres long. It starts at the Tullamarine Freeway interchange in Essendon and turns into the Calder Highway near Castlemaine. It replaces the Calder Highway between Castlemaine and Melbourne. It has 6 lanes between Melbourne and Gisborne. It continues as 4 lanes onwards. Its major junctions are the Western Ring Road, Midland Highway and the Pyrenees Highway. It is a very busy road in between Melbourne and Woodend. The major  towns the freeway goes through are Sunbury, Gisborne, Macedon, Woodend, Kyneton and Castlemaine.

M80

Ring Road 

The M80 Ring Road (also known as the Western Ring Road in the West of Melbourne and Metropolitan Ring Road in the Northern Suburbs) is 38 kilometres long. It starts at the West Gate & Princes Freeway interchange at Laverton North and continues around the Western and northern suburbs of Melbourne before continuing as the North East Link at Greensborough. Its major intersections are Western Freeway, Calder Freeway, Tullamarine Freeway and the Hume Freeway. The major towns it passes through are Laverton North, Albion, Keilor Park, Fawkner, Greensborough and Watsonia North.

North East Link

M420

South Gippsland Freeway 

The South Gippsland Freeway is a 6 kilometre freeway which starts at the Monash Freeway at Dandenong and ends turns into the Western Port Highway at Lynbrook. It has 4 lanes for all its length. It is the shortest Freeway in all of Victoria. It links Cranbourne to Dandenong. Its major junctions are Monash Freeway, Princes Highway, South Gippsland Highway and Pound Road. The major towns it goes through are Lynbrook, Doveton and Dandenong.

See also 

Victoria
 
Victoria
Freeways